Ana Pešikan (born  Feketić, PR Serbia, FPR Yugoslavia) is a Serbian politician who served as the Minister of Science and Technology in the Government of Serbia from 2007 to 2008.

Biography
Pešikan graduated from the Faculty of Philosophy, Department of Psychology, and received her MA and PhD degrees. She participated in over 30 projects of developmental and pedagogical psychology, she was UNICEF’s consultant for education, member of expert team for text books, member of the committee of the Fund for Young Talents. She is a lecturer of doctoral studies at the Belgrade Faculty of Philosophy and Faculty of Chemistry.

Sources
Profile of Ana Pešikan, Kapija, 22 June 2007. (in Serbian)

People from Mali Iđoš
G17 Plus politicians
Government ministers of Serbia
Living people

Year of birth missing (living people)